Muttersprache refers to the German mother tongue.

Muttersprache may also refer to:
Muttersprache (linguistic society), Austria
Muttersprache (album), album by German singer Sarah Connor released in 2015